Pashindeh (also Romanized as Pashīndeh, Pīshandeh, and Pashandeh; also known as Pashvandeh and Poshvandeh) is a village in Raz Rural District, Raz and Jargalan District, Bojnord County, North Khorasan Province, Iran. At the 2006 census, its population was 1,178, in 266 families.

References 

Populated places in Bojnord County